Kurt Rey (born 10 December 1923, date of death unknown) was a Swiss football defender who played for Switzerland in the 1950 FIFA World Cup. He also played for SC Young Fellows Juventus. Rey is deceased.

References

1923 births
Year of death missing
Swiss men's footballers
Switzerland international footballers
Association football defenders
1950 FIFA World Cup players